Timothy J. McCarthy (born June 20, 1949) is an American former policeman and special agent in the United States Secret Service. McCarthy is best known for defending President Ronald Reagan during the assassination attempt on Reagan's life on Monday, March 30, 1981, in Washington, D.C.

During the assassination attempt, McCarthy spread his stance to protect Reagan as six bullets were being fired by the would-be assassin, John Hinckley Jr. McCarthy stepped in front of President Reagan, and took a bullet to the chest but made a full recovery. 

After the assassination attempt, McCarthy was hailed as a hero and received the NCAA Award of Valor in 1982.

Early life
McCarthy was born on June 20, 1949, and was raised in Chicago's Ashburn neighborhood. He graduated from St. Denis Grammar School and Leo Catholic High School. He then attended the University of Illinois at Urbana-Champaign. 

He joined the Fighting Illini football team as a walk on in his freshman year. He earned a football scholarship for his sophomore year and played as strong safety his junior year before an injury ended his college career. 

While there, he was a member of Delta Tau Delta. He graduated in 1971 with a Bachelor of Science in finance and joined the United States Secret Service shortly thereafter.

Law enforcement career

His career included eight years assigned to the Presidential Protective Division in Washington D.C. and 14 years as a criminal investigator in Chicago. McCarthy was the special agent in charge of the Secret Service Chicago Division from 1989 until his retirement in October 1993.

Reagan assassination attempt 

On March 30, 1981, John Hinckley Jr. opened fire on President Ronald Reagan as he exited the Washington Hilton Hotel after giving a speech, firing six bullets in 1.7 seconds. As Special Agent In Charge Jerry Parr quickly pushed Reagan into the limousine, McCarthy put himself in the line of fire and spread his body in front of Reagan to make himself a target. He was struck in the chest by the fourth bullet, the bullet traversing McCarthy's right lung, diaphragm, and right lobe of the liver. McCarthy was not wearing a bullet proof vest.

McCarthy was not supposed to be on duty that day. At the last minute, the Secret Service received a request for an officer to provide protection to Reagan for an AFL-CIO luncheon on March 31. McCarthy and a colleague flipped a coin to see who would have to fill in on their day off; McCarthy lost.

McCarthy was taken to George Washington University Hospital, and was operated on near the president. He was the first of the wounded men to be discharged from the hospital.

Post-Secret Service career 
McCarthy became the Chief of the Orland Park Police Department in May 1994. 

In 1998, he ran for the Democratic nomination for Illinois Secretary of State against Jesse White of Chicago, then the Recorder of Deeds for Cook County, and State Senator Penny Severns of Decatur. Severns was removed from the ballot after failing to meet the signature requirement. McCarthy ran an outsider campaign that took a law-enforcement approach to the Secretary of State's office including standardized DUI tests and easier to read license plates. White won the primary election with 55% of the vote to McCarthy's 45% of the vote, or a margin of 100,195 votes.

In 1999, he earned a Master of Science degree in criminal/social justice from Lewis University in Romeoville, Illinois.

In March 2016, he was awarded the first annual Chief of Police of the Year award by the Illinois Association of Chiefs of Police. The award cited his legislative advocacy, supervision of the building of the country's first police station to receive a LEED Gold certification, working to establish the South Suburban Major Crimes Task Force, promoting crisis intervention training for officers and the use of Narcan to prevent heroin overdoses. From July 2016 to April 2017 he served as the acting village manager of Orland Park. In recent years, he has served as the corporate vice president of a security systems company. Currently, he speaks to schools and conventions about his experiences as a Secret Service Agent during the Reagan administration.

On July 1, 2020, McCarthy announced his retirement effective August 1, 2020.

Personal life 
McCarthy is married and has three children.

McCarthy was interviewed in 2016 about the release of John Hinckley Jr., and responded: "I don't have to agree with it, but I expected it. There are very few cases that people, after a period of time, are viewed as no longer being a danger to themselves or others. I hope they're right about it. It's a big decision. I give the judge credit. That's what he gets paid for."

References

External links
Orland Park Police Department-Meet the Chief of Police
McCarthy Biography
2005 Illinois Bar Association Award

Living people
1949 births
American police chiefs
People from Chicago
Illinois Democrats
United States Secret Service agents
Gies College of Business alumni
American shooting survivors
Attempted assassination of Ronald Reagan
People from Orland Park, Illinois
Wardens of the Auburn Correctional Facility